Bernard George Webber (August 6, 1914 – December 5, 2000) was an educator and political figure in British Columbia. He represented Similkameen from 1941 to 1945 as a Co-operative Commonwealth Federation member.

He was born in Winnipeg, Manitoba. He was employed as a school principal, as a District Superintendent of Schools, as an assistant Superintendent of Public Instruction for the Ministry of Education and as Superintendent of Special Education for the ministry. Webber was president of the Okanagan Historical Society from 1989 to 1991. He was defeated by Reginald Robert Laird when he ran for reelection in 1945. Webber died in Vancouver at the age of 86.

Webber wrote the book .

References 

1914 births
2000 deaths
British Columbia Liberal Party MLAs